Callistus II Xanthopoulos or Xanthopulus (? – after 1397) was a Byzantine Hesychast monk and spiritual writer who reigned as Ecumenical Patriarch of Constantinople in 1397. He was Patriarch through the reign of the Byzantine Emperor Manuel II Palaiologos, and through his short Patriarchal reign Constantinople was under siege by the Ottoman Sultan Bayezid I. Within the Orthodox Church, his memory is celebrated on 22 November.

His surname indicates that he was from the monastery of Xanthopoulos. The majority of Patriarchs in the 14th century were monks in the Hesychast tradition.

References

Sources 

 Hunter H.D., "Callistus II Xanthopulus, Patriarch of Constantinople", 
 Hussey, J.M.. The Orthodox Church in the Byzantine Empire. Oxford: University Press, 1986.

14th-century births
1397 deaths
14th-century patriarchs of Constantinople
Byzantine saints of the Eastern Orthodox Church
Philokalia